Primary cutaneous histoplasmosis is a rare skin condition, reported on the penis, characterized by a chancre-type lesion with regional adenopathy.

See also 
 Histoplasmosis

References 

Mycosis-related cutaneous conditions